Gregson Hazell (born 13 December 1991) is a Vincentian footballer and a Saint Vincent and the Grenadines U-20 international, and also plays for the senior team.

References

1991 births
Living people
Saint Vincent and the Grenadines footballers
People from Saint Vincent (Antilles)

Association football defenders
Saint Vincent and the Grenadines international footballers